Petite-Vallée is a municipality in the Gaspésie-Îles-de-la-Madeleine region of the province of Quebec in Canada.

The municipality was formed in 1957, when it separated from the Township Municipality of Cloridorme. Its name (French for "Little Valley") describes its location in the hollow of a shallow valley and dates back to at least 1754 when it appeared on a map by Jacques-Nicolas Bellin.

Demographics

Population

Language

See also

 List of municipalities in Quebec

References 

Incorporated places in Gaspésie–Îles-de-la-Madeleine
Municipalities in Quebec